Brother Jack is the debut album by organist Jack McDuff recorded in 1960 and released on the Prestige label.

Reception

AllMusic reviewer Jim Todd stated: "Recorded in 1960, the session is a transitional one, both for jazz organ and for one of the instrument's leading players".

Track listing 
All compositions by Jack McDuff, except where indicated.
 "Brother Jack" – 4:00  
 "Mr. Wonderful" (Jerry Bock, Larry Holofcener, George David Weiss) – 3:53  
 "Noon Train" – 5:51  
 "Drowsy" – 3:37  
 "Organ Grinder's Swing" (Will Hudson, Irving Mills, Mitchell Parish) – 2:55  
 "Mack 'N' Duff" – 5:10  
 "You're Driving Me Crazy" (Walter Donaldson) – 4:47
 "Light Blues" (Bill Jennings, Jack McDuff) – 6:01

Personnel 
Jack McDuff – Hammond B3 organ
Bill Jennings – guitar
Wendell Marshall – bass
Alvin Johnson – drums

References 

1960 debut albums
Jack McDuff albums
Prestige Records albums
Albums recorded at Van Gelder Studio
Albums produced by Esmond Edwards